The Crane Wildlife Refuge, located in Ipswich and Essex, Massachusetts, is a  property managed by The Trustees of Reservations.  Located nearby are the Trustees of Reservations managed Castle Hill and Crane Beach. The refuge was established in 1974.

References

External links
Crane Wildlife Refuge on the Crane Estate The Trustees of Reservations
Trail map

The Trustees of Reservations
Protected areas of Essex County, Massachusetts
Ipswich, Massachusetts
Essex, Massachusetts
Open space reserves of Massachusetts
Protected areas established in 1974
1974 establishments in Massachusetts